The Catskill Mountain 3500 Club, incorporated as the Catskill 3500 Club and often just referred to as the 3500 Club, is a peakbagging organization for hikers in the Catskill Mountains of New York. Those wishing to become members must climb all 35 Catskill High Peaks and, in a departure from the requirements of most other such clubs, climb Slide, Blackhead, Balsam and Panther mountains again in winter, which is defined by the Club's by-laws as the period from December 21 to March 21 regardless of the actual occurrences of the winter solstice and vernal equinox in particular years. The Club also awards a separate patch for those who go on to climb all 35 peaks during winter.

Until fairly recently it was the only hiking organization with a specific Catskill focus.

Membership

Members record their climbs on a tally sheet and then submit them to the Club's membership chair when they have completed their last required peak. This is mostly done on the honor system; however sometimes the tally sheets are cross-checked against the logs kept in the canisters the club maintains at the summits of the 13 peaks that lack a trail to the summit.

 there are 3,323 regular members and 1,335 winter members. Those who have not yet finished the prescribed 39 climbs (35 regular, 4 winter) are referred to as aspirants. Members and aspirants alike may subscribe to the quarterly newsletter of the organization, The Catskill Canister, for $10 per annum. In the case of members, this payment additionally represents an annual dues payment; those who are paid up are considered active members. The organization offers lifetime memberships.

History
The Club traces its origins to the early 1950s, when Dan Smiley, a descendant of the founders of Mohonk Mountain House and his fellow birders were trying to track down the elusive Bicknell's thrush, then considered an unimportant subspecies of the gray-cheeked thrush. Since it prefers to mate and spend its summers in cool, shady places like the boreal forests found on the summits of higher mountains in the Northeast, Smiley and his fellow birders drew up a list of the peaks in the Catskills over 3,500 feet and thus likely to have such forestation.

Their goal was not to bag peaks but simply to find the thrush. Nonetheless, they published their list of (at that time) 33 peaks in a nature journal.  Area hikers who saw it began organizing trips to the peaks with an eye toward completing the list, and in 1962 informally organized the club as a Catskill counterpart to the well-established Adirondack Forty-Sixers. Later that year William and Elinore Leavitt of Hudson became the first two members of the club, after newly issued maps resulted in the addition of Friday and Mount Sherrill to the list at the expense of Dry Brook Ridge.

In 1966 the Club was formally incorporated, and has counted that year as its founding date ever since. The Leavitts and 23 others who had climbed all the peaks in the meantime were accepted as charter members. Three of the five people who had played important roles in founding the club were, for various reasons, never able to become members; and Dan Smiley himself died with only one climb left for membership.

The peak list would remain in this form until 1991, when Southwest Hunter Mountain, a trailless peak lacking an official name, was added after a contentious membership vote. It had originally been left off the list due to uncertainty over whether it was really a separate peak or not and the difficulty of establishing where its summit was.

In 2021 the Gould family, which owns the summits of Graham and Doubletop, closed off access to those two peaks due to the impact of greatly increased hiking on the area, particularly after the COVID-19 pandemic had led to an increase in outdoor recreation the year before. The club has advised aspiring members to climb to Doubletop's slightly lower southern summit, on state land, and Mill Brook Ridge in the meantime, and removed the canister from Doubletop.

Activities
The Club sponsors hikes on almost every weekend of the year to the various peaks, and sometimes to other mountains of interest in the Catskills. It is also responsible for maintaining the trail over Peekamoose and Table mountains, and does litter cleanup on the section of Route 214 south of Stony Clove Notch (Both routes are currently part of the Long Path long-distance hiking trail).

Every spring it holds an annual dinner in Kingston along with its membership meeting, at which new members and winter members from the previous year who are in attendance receive their patches and any matters requiring the vote of the full membership are taken up. It is usually followed by a presentation on some matter of interest concerning the Catskills.

All activities are listed in the Club’s quarterly newsletter, the Catskill Canister, which also includes poetry, short articles about hiking and the Catskills and news about members.

Advocacy
It has also advocated for the interests of hikers in the Catskills, lobbying against the construction of a trail up the north ridge of Slide and in favor of expanding the amount of Forest Preserve designated as wilderness, for example. In recent years the Club has also begun to take a more active stewardship role, helping to raise money for construction and maintenance efforts and land purchases.

Canister controversy
This role brought it into conflict with the New York State Department of Environmental Conservation, which manages the Catskill lands, in 1999 when DEC's Unit Management Plan for the Slide Mountain Wilderness Area called for the removal of the canisters from the trailless peaks in that unit, arguing that they were not consistent with wilderness values and contributed to degradation of the summits.

After an overwhelming response in favor of retaining them, DEC and the Club reached a compromise in the pending update to the Catskill Park State Land Master Plan in which DEC would take over ownership of the canisters, the names of mountains would be removed from the exteriors and the canisters themselves repainted a dull grey on those summits that lie within areas designated Wilderness by the DEC.

References

Waterman, Guy and Laura, Forest and Crag: A History of Hiking, Trail Blazing and Adventure in the Northeast Mountains, Appalachian Mountain Club, Boston, Mass., 1989. 640, 649.
The Catskill Canister. Quarterly publication, 1968 to present

External links
Club website
Membership Requirements

Hiking organizations in the United States
Catskills
Environmental organizations based in New York (state)
Peak bagging in the United States
Sports organizations established in 1965